Lieutenant Frederick John Hunt was an English World War I flying ace credited with nine aerial victories.

Early life
Hunt was born in Whitchurch, Hampshire, England in 1899 the son of Frederick and Emily Hunt, his father was a coal and corn merchant. He would not be old enough for military duty until late in World War I; his earliest known record of service is 1918.

World War I
Hunt was stationed with 74 Squadron in July 1918. He became a balloon buster for his first aerial victory on 1 September 1918, and would win over another balloon and seven of Germany's finest fighter of the war, the Fokker D.VII, by war's end. He was awarded a Distinguished Flying Cross after his seventh victory, though it would not be gazetted until 1 February 1919.

List of aerial victories
See also Aerial victory standards of World War I

Post World War I
On 31 March 1923, Hunt and Roland John Neale dissolved their partnership in "The Whitchurch Engineering Works". The firm's business was motor, agricultural, and general engineering.

Hunt was living in Ellisfield when his marriage to Frances Ann Selmer of Valparaíso, Chile was set for 29 September 1927.

References
 Shores, Christopher F.; Franks, Norman L. R.; Guest, Russell. Above The Trenches: A Complete Record of the Fighter Aces and Units of the British Empire Air Forces 1915-1920. Grub Street, 1990. , .

Endnotes

1899 births
1954 deaths
English aviators
Royal Air Force officers
Recipients of the Distinguished Flying Cross (United Kingdom)
People from Whitchurch, Hampshire
People from Ellisfield